Marc Smith may refer to:

Marc Smith (poet) (born 1949), American creator and founder of the poetry slam movement
Marc Smith (bridge) (born 1960), British bridge player, columnist, and book author
Marc Smith (palaeographer) (born 1963), French palaeographer

See also
 Mark Smith (disambiguation)
 Marcus Smith (disambiguation)